Sican may refer to:

The Sican culture in what is now Peru
Sican language
The Sicani, a people of ancient Sicily
A person with the surname Sican:
Elizabeth Sican, 18th-century Irish literary critic